La Yaung Phyar Tae Inlay Mhar is a 2017 Burmese thriller-drama film, directed by Nyunt Myanmar Nyi Nyi Aung starring  Nay Toe, Wutt Hmone Shwe Yi and Wah Zin.The film, produced by Wah Wah Win Shwe Film Production premiered in Myanmar on January 5, 2017.

Cast
Nay Toe as Min Naung Yoe
Wutt Hmone Shwe Yi as Kyar Nyo Thwe
Wah Zin as Sai Wunna
Hsu Myat Noe Oo as Nandar

References

2017 films
2010s Burmese-language films
Burmese thriller films
Films shot in Myanmar
2017 thriller films